The Bratislava City Museum (abbr. MMB) is a museum in Bratislava, Slovakia, established in 1868. Its headquarters are located in the Old Town, near the Main Square at the Old Town Hall. The museum is owned by one of the 11 allowance organizations of the City of Bratislava.

The museum documents the history of Bratislava from the earliest periods until the 20th century. The Bratislava City Museum is the oldest museum in continuous operation in Slovakia.

Displays
The Bratislava City Museum manages eight specialized museums with nine permanent displays throughout the city: 
 Museum of the City History: main museum, which displays archaeological discoveries and findings and documents a history of pharmacy, culture, social life and numismatics
 Museum of Arms and City Fortifications in the tower above Michael's Gate
 Museum of Clocks, housed at the House of the Good Shepherd
 Johann Nepomuk Hummel museum
 Arthur Fleischmann museum
 Janko Jesenský museum
 Devín Castle National Cultural Monument in Devín
 Gerulata National Cultural Monument in Rusovce.

See also
Museums and galleries of Bratislava

References

External links
 Bratislava City Museum official website 
 Bratislava City Museum official website 

Museums established in 1868
Museums in Bratislava
City museums
History museums in Slovakia
History museums